In probability theory and statistics, smoothness of a density function is a measure which determines how many times the density function can be differentiated, or equivalently the limiting behavior of distribution’s characteristic function.

Formally, we call the distribution of a random variable X ordinary smooth of order β  if its characteristic function satisfies
 
for some positive constants d0, d1, β. The examples of such distributions are gamma, exponential, uniform, etc.

The distribution is called supersmooth of order β   if its characteristic function satisfies
 
for some positive constants d0, d1, β, γ and constants β0, β1. Such supersmooth distributions have derivatives of all orders. Examples: normal, Cauchy, mixture normal.

References 

 

Theory of probability distributions